Manínska Gorge (in Slovak, Manínska tiesňava) is a national nature reserve, and the narrowest canyon in Slovakia.

It lies in the Súľov Mountains,  from Považská Bystrica. It is a place of great tourist interest, because of its wild and rare flora and fauna.

External links 
 Article about the valley

Landforms of Slovakia
Protected areas of the Western Carpathians
Geography of Trenčín Region
Tourist attractions in Trenčín Region
Canyons and gorges of Europe